Traveller Book 4: Mercenary is a 1978 role-playing game supplement for Traveller published by Game Designers' Workshop.

Contents
Mercenary is the fourth Traveller book, supplementing the original game of three volumes. The volume covers how to create a mercenary character for a Traveller campaign, and how the player can try to have the mercenary recruited. The book also updates the Traveller weapons and combat system.

Reception
In the March-April 1979 edition of The Space Gamer (Issue No. 22) Tony Watson recommended Mercenary, saying, "Over all, Mercenary is a good effort, worthy of the game it supplements. Players and referees who have an inclination towards the more martial aspect of the game should be sure and include the book into their campaigns."

In the June 1979 edition of Dragon (Issue 26), Mark Day found the physical quality and layout to be excellent, but questioned why mercenaries could only come from Army or Marines rather than Navy and Scouts. He also questioned why huge plasma rifles were offered in the weapons update, but not simple laser pistols.
     
In the August-September 1979 edition of White Dwarf (Issue 14), Don Turnbull gave Mercenary 9 out of 10, saying, "If you are into Traveller, this will be a welcome extension to the rules and will add to the already wide scope of them."  

In the May-June 1980 edition of The Space Gamer (Issue No. 28) Forrest Johnson recommended Mercenary, saying, "If you would like to spend an evening rolling up some rather interesting characters, you will like this book."

Reviews
Fantastic Science Fiction v27 n10

References

Role-playing game supplements introduced in 1978
Traveller (role-playing game) supplements